Judith Davis (born 23 April 1955) is an Australian actress in film, television, and on stage. With a career spanning over 40 years, she has been commended for her versatility and regarded as one of the finest actresses of her generation. Frequent collaborator Woody Allen described her as, "one of the most exciting actresses in the world". She is the most awarded recipient for the AACTA Award with nine accolades and has received numerous accolades, including three Primetime Emmy Awards, two British Academy Film Awards, and two Golden Globe Awards, and two nominations for Academy Awards.

Davis is a 1977 graduate of the National Institute of Dramatic Art, where she starred opposite Mel Gibson in Romeo and Juliet. Most of Davis's stage work has been in Australia, including Visions (1979), Piaf (1980), Miss Julie (1983), King Lear (1984), Hedda Gabler (1986), Victory (2004) and The Seagull (2011), but she also starred in the 1982 London production of Insignificance, for which she was nominated for the Laurence Olivier Award for Best Actress, and the 1989 Los Angeles production of Hapgood. She returned to the National Institute of Dramatic Art in 2017 to direct the play Love and Money.

She has won British Academy Film Awards for both Best Actress and Most Promising Newcomer for the film My Brilliant Career (1979), two Australian Film Institute Awards as Best Actress for Winter of Our Dreams (1981) and Supporting Actress for Hoodwink (1981), and later received Academy Award nominations for A Passage to India (1984) and Husbands and Wives (1992). This made her the first Australian to receive nominations in both categories and the fourth Australian actress to receive an Academy Award nomination. Her other film roles include High Rolling (1977), Who Dares Wins (1982), Heatwave (1983), High Tide (1987), Georgia (1988), Alice (1990), George Sand in Impromptu (1991), Barton Fink (1991), Dark Blood (1993), Absolute Power (1997), Deconstructing Harry (1997), Celebrity (1998), The Man Who Sued God (2001), The Break-up (2006), Anne d'Arpajon in Marie Antoinette (2006), The Eye of the Storm (2011), To Rome with Love (2012), The Young and Prodigious T.S. Spivet (2013), and The Dressmaker (2015).

For her work on television, Davis won Primetime Emmy Awards for Serving in Silence: The Margarethe Cammermeyer Story (1995), for playing Judy Garland in Life with Judy Garland: Me and My Shadows (2001) and The Starter Wife (2007) and the Golden Globe Award for Best Actress – Miniseries or Television Film for Life with Judy Garland: Me and My Shadows and One Against the Wind (1991). Other television roles include Water Under the Bridge (1980), A Woman Called Golda (1982), A Cooler Climate (1999), Nancy Reagan in The Reagans (2003), Coast to Coast (2003), Sante Kimes in A Little Thing Called Murder (2006), Page Eight (2011), Hedda Hopper in Feud: Bette and Joan (2017), Mystery Road (2018), and Ratched (2020).

Early and personal life
Davis was born in Perth, Western Australia in the suburb of Floreat Park and had a strict Catholic upbringing. She was educated at Loreto Convent and the Western Australian Institute of Technology and graduated from the National Institute of Dramatic Art (NIDA), Sydney, Australia in 1977.

She has been married to actor and fellow NIDA graduate Colin Friels since 1984; they have two children, son Jack and daughter Charlotte. Their relationship was briefly in the media when an argument led to a domestic violence court order against Friels – however, they remained together. They live in the Sydney suburb of Birchgrove, New South Wales.

Career

Rise to prominence (1979–1989)
After making her feature film debut in the buddy comedy High Rolling (1977), Davis first came to prominence for her role as Sybylla Melvyn in the coming-of-age saga My Brilliant Career (1979), for which she won BAFTA Awards for Best Actress and Best Newcomer. Davis was particularly praised for her performance; Janet Maslin of The New York Times admired her for bringing "an unconventional vigor to every scene she's in, even in a film that's as consistently animated as this one", while Luke Buckmaster, writing for The Guardian in 2014, commented that Davis gave "a rousing performance as bull-headed protagonist Sybylla Melvyn. The term "once in a lifetime" tends to be slapped around like a bumper sticker, but this meaty role lives up to the accolade." Her success continued with lead roles in the Australian New Wave films Winter of Our Dreams (1981), as a waif-like heroin addict; the drama Heatwave (1982), as a radical Sydney tenant organizer; and the thriller Hoodwink (1981), as a sexually-repressed clergyman's wife. Of her performance in Winter of Our Dreams, Roger Ebert wrote that: "Davis brought a kind of wiry, feisty intelligence to My Brilliant Career, playing an Australian farm woman who rather felt she would do things her own way. She's wonderful again this time, in a completely different role as an insecure, distrustful, skinny street waif. [She] performs her movement magnificently.

Her international film career began when she played the younger version of Ingrid Bergman's Golda Meir in the television docudrama A Woman Called Golda (1981), for which she received a Primetime Emmy Award for Outstanding Supporting Actress – Miniseries or a Movie nomination. She then played a terrorist in the British film Who Dares Wins (1982).

She was cast as Adela Quested in David Lean's final film A Passage to India (1984), an adaptation of E. M. Forster's novel, and was nominated for the Academy Award for Best Actress. Variety praised Davis for having "the rare gift of being able to look very plain (as the role calls for) at one moment and uncommonly beautiful at another. Likewise, The Washington Post wrote, "With makeup the color of smudged ivory, her pallor enhanced by the off-white linens she wears, Davis is daringly unattractive for a leading lady; that plainness is emphasized in the book. Davis' neuroticism, her way of twitching and thrusting her jaw and looking up hungrily beneath the brim of her straw hat, brings to life the ravenous sexuality beneath Miss Quested's decorous exterior."

She returned to Australian cinema for her next two films, Kangaroo (1987), as a German-born writer's wife, and High Tide (also 1987), as a foot-loose mother attempting to reunite with her teenage daughter who is being raised by the paternal grandmother. Her performance in the latter won her glowing praise. Pauline Kael called Davis "a genius at moods" and wrote, "As one of three backup singers for a touring Elvis imitator, Judy Davis is contemptuous of the cruddy act, contemptuous of herself. The film's emotional suggestiveness makes it almost a primal woman's picture: Judy Davis has been compared with Jeanne Moreau, and that's apt, but she's Moreau without the cultural swank, the high-fashion gloss. She speaks to us more directly." She won additional Australian Film Institute Awards for both roles, and a National Society of Film Critics award for High Tides brief American theatrical run. Her final film of the decade, the Australian thriller Georgia (1988), saw her play dual roles, a mother, Georgia, and her daughter Nina. For her performance, Davis earned another Australian Film Institute nomination for Best Actress.

Established actress (1990–1999)
Davis had a cameo in Woody Allen's Alice (1990), her first appearance in an Allen-directed film. The following year, she was featured in Joel Coen's Barton Fink, which won the Palme d'Or at the Cannes Film Festival, and in David Cronenberg's adaptation of the hallucinogenic novel Naked Lunch. She returned to E. M. Forster territory in Where Angels Fear to Tread and won an Independent Spirit Award for her work as mannish woman author George Sand in Impromptu, a romantic period drama with Hugh Grant as her consumptive lover, Frédéric Chopin. Davis was especially lauded for her performance as Sand, and Hal Hinson of The Washington Post wrote, "Judy Davis makes her entrances as if she were straddling a cyclone. She doesn't just walk in, she blows in on a torrent of extravagant self-assurance and wild temperament. Sand, who's the locus of this blissfully high-spirited romp about the circle of writers and musicians in 1830s Paris, never does anything halfway; her life is an experiment in full-throttle, passionate immersion, and that's why Davis is the ideal actress for the part. She's the most atmospheric of actors, perhaps the only one around capable of streaking the screen with lightning." She earned an Emmy nomination and her first Golden Globe Award for Best Actress – Miniseries or Television Film for her portrayal of a real-life Second World War heroine Mary Lindell in the CBS Hallmark Hall of Fame presentation One Against the Wind. Adrian Turner of Radio Times noted of her, "Judy Davis, one of the greatest and least "starry" actresses around, plays Lindell and shows the same sensitivity that she brought to her role in A Passage to India."

Cast in Woody Allen's Husbands and Wives (1992), Davis performed the major role of Sally Simmons, one half of a divorcing couple. Husbands and Wives was well received, and Davis's performance drew high praise. Vincent Canby of The New York Times wrote, "Sally must be one of the most endearingly impossible characters Mr. Allen has ever written, and Ms. Davis nearly purloins the film" and Todd McCarthy of Variety thought Davis had revealed "a whole new side to her personality that has never surfaced onscreen before." For this performance, she earned both Oscar and Golden Globe nominations for Best Supporting Actress.

She next co-starred with Kevin Spacey in the comedy film The Ref (1994), portraying a married couple whose relationship is on the rocks, with Denis Leary playing a thief who counsels their marriage. Roger Ebert called Davis "naturally verbal" and praised her for being able to "develop a manic counterpoint" in her arguments with Spacey "that elevates them to a sort of art form." Similarly, Rolling Stone magazine's Peter Travers found Davis "combustibly funny, finding nuance even in nonsense." Considered "one of the fiercest film actors around", Davis's other roles have included the mysterious, schizophrenic mother of a teenager in boarding school in On My Own (1993), the lifelong Australian Communist Party member reacting to the downfall of the Soviet Union in Children of the Revolution (1996), two more Allen films, Deconstructing Harry (1997) and Celebrity (1998) and a highly-strung White House chief of staff in Absolute Power (1997). After appearing in Celebrity, The Guardian newspaper wrote that Davis "in recent years has succeeded Diane Keaton and Mia Farrow as Allen's misfit muse."

Much of her work in the late nineties was for television, gaining a collection of Emmy Award nominations. She won her first Emmy for portraying the woman who gently coaxes a rigid military woman, Glenn Close, out of the closet in Serving in Silence: The Margarethe Cammermeyer Story, with subsequent nominations for her repressed Australian outback mother in The Echo of Thunder (1998), her portrayal of Lillian Hellman in Dash and Lilly (1999) and her frigid society matron in A Cooler Climate (1999).

Later work (2000–present)
Davis earned a second Emmy for her portrayal of Judy Garland in the television biographical film Life with Judy Garland: Me and My Shadows (2001). In 2003, she earned another Emmy nomination for her interpretation of Nancy Reagan in the controversial biopic The Reagans. In 2004 she co-starred with Richard Dreyfus in Coast to Coast. In July 2006, she received her ninth Emmy nomination for her performance in the television film A Little Thing Called Murder. Her tenth nomination came in 2007 for Outstanding Supporting Actress in the U.S. miniseries The Starter Wife for which she was awarded the Emmy. In August 2007, she appeared opposite Sam Waterston in an episode of ABC's anthology series Masters of Science Fiction. She appeared on the TV mini-series Diamonds from 2008–2009.

In film, she continued to earn good notices for her supporting roles in Swimming Upstream (2003), as a working-class mother, and in the films The Break-Up (2006) and Marie-Antoinette. Davis appeared as Jill Tankard in a television drama film, Page Eight (2011), for which she was nominated for an Emmy. She played Dorothy de Lascabanes in The Eye of the Storm (2011), an adaptation of Patrick White's novel of the same title, for which she won the Australian Film Institute Award for Best Actress in a Leading Role. She also had a major role as Woody Allen's psychiatrist wife in his To Rome with Love.

Davis co-starred with Helena Bonham Carter and Callum Keith Rennie in The Young and Prodigious T.S. Spivet (2013). She reprised her role of Jill Tankard in Salting the Battlefield (2014) and costarred with Kate Winslet in The Dressmaker (2015), for which she won an AACTA Award for Best Supporting Actress. Although the film received mixed reviews, Davis's supporting performance was lauded by critics: Richard Ouzounian of the Toronto Star called her "sublime" and Justin Chang of Variety wrote, "Davis, whose performance here as a booze-swilling, dementia-addled and infernally sharp-tongued old matriarch is enough of a hoot to make one further wonder what she might have done with the role of Violet Weston in August: Osage County, onscreen or onstage."

In 2017, Davis received a Primetime Emmy nomination for her supporting performance as gossip columnist Hedda Hopper in Ryan Murphy's anthology television series Feud. The following year, Davis co-starred with Aaron Pederson in the six-part ABC TV Series, Mystery Road. Davis's performance as the local police sergeant was praised, and The New York Times wrote, "The thing that really sets Mystery Road apart is the actress who signed on to play the outback sergeant Emma James: the great Judy Davis, playing a police officer for the first time in her career and starring in an Australian TV series for the first time in nearly 40 years. Ms. Davis is so firmly identified in the American mind with intense, often neurotic city-dwelling characters that it takes an episode or two to get used to her climbing in and out of a police car in the dusty, empty landscapes, wearing a baggy blue uniform that swallows her tiny frame. It seems at first as if she might not be right for the part, but eventually you see that she's perfect. James is a formidable woman stuck in the middle of nowhere because of the bonds of family and history, and Ms. Davis's preternatural intelligence and tightly capped energy serve her well."

In January 2019, it was announced that Davis will star in the Netflix drama series Ratched.

Stage
Davis's stage work has been mostly confined to Australia. Early in her career, she played Juliet opposite Mel Gibson's Romeo. In 1978, she appeared in Visions by Louis Nowra at the Paris Theatre Company in Sydney. In 1980, she portrayed French chanteuse Edith Piaf in Stephen Barry's production of the Pam Gems play Piaf at the Perth Playhouse. She played both Cordelia and the Fool in a 1984 staging of King Lear by the Nimrod Theatre Company, and also starred in its productions of Strindberg's Miss Julie, Chekhov's The Bear, Louis Nowra's Inside The Island and, in 1986, the title role of Ibsen's Hedda Gabler for the Sydney Theatre Company.

In 2004, she starred in and co-directed Howard Barker's play Victory, as a Puritan woman determined to locate her husband's dismembered corpse. Other stage directorial efforts include Sheridan's The School For Scandal and Barrymore by William Luce (all three for the Sydney Theatre Company). She created the role of The Actress in Terry Johnson's Insignificance at the Royal Court in London, receiving an Olivier Award nomination, and appeared in a brief 1989 Los Angeles production of Tom Stoppard's Hapgood. Writing for Philadelphia magazine, David Fox found her "marvelous in the title role, as charismatic and commanding on stage as she is in film."

In 2011, she portrayed the role of fading actress Irina Arkadina in Anton Chekhov's The Seagull at Sydney's Belvoir St Theatre. Paul Chai of Variety praised her performance as Irina, writing, "Davis manages to instill Irina with not only a diva's haughty air and crafty manipulation but also with the right hint of fragility, as evidenced in her concern about being upstaged by the youthful and beautiful Nina."

Filmography

Accolades

References

External links
 
 
 
 

1955 births
Living people
20th-century Australian actresses
21st-century Australian actresses
Actresses from Perth, Western Australia
Australian film actresses
Australian stage actresses
Australian television actresses
Australian theatre directors
BAFTA Most Promising Newcomer to Leading Film Roles winners
Best Actress AACTA Award winners
Best Actress BAFTA Award winners
Best Miniseries or Television Movie Actress Golden Globe winners
Best Supporting Actress AACTA Award winners
Curtin University alumni
National Institute of Dramatic Art alumni
Outstanding Performance by a Female Actor in a Miniseries or Television Movie Screen Actors Guild Award winners
Outstanding Performance by a Lead Actress in a Miniseries or Movie Primetime Emmy Award winners
Outstanding Performance by a Supporting Actress in a Miniseries or Movie Primetime Emmy Award winners
Independent Spirit Award for Best Female Lead winners